Andrews McMeel Universal (AMU) is an American media corporation based in Kansas City, Missouri. It was founded in 1970 by Jim Andrews and John McMeel as Universal Press Syndicate and was renamed in 1997 to AMU to reflect the diversification that had taken place since its founding. It has the subdivisions:
 Andrews McMeel Syndication, which includes GoComics
 Andrews McMeel Publishing (established 1973)
 AMUSE (Andrews McMeel Universal Syndicated Entertainment)

Headquarters
The company headquarters is located in downtown Kansas City, Missouri in the historic Boley Building. The six-story steel frame building was constructed in 1909 and was designed in the Art-Nouveau style by architect Louis Curtiss. The building is one of the world's first metal-and-glass curtain-wall buildings and the first to use rolled-steel columns. It was listed on the National Register of Historic Places in 1971.

References

External links

Mass media companies established in 1970
Companies based in Kansas City, Missouri
1970 establishments in Missouri